The South Bank Show is a British television arts magazine series originally produced by London Weekend Television and broadcast on ITV between 1978 and 2010. A new version of the series began 27 May 2012 on Sky Arts. Conceived, written, and presented by former BBC arts broadcaster Melvyn Bragg, the show aims to bring both high art and popular culture to a mass audience.

History

ITV (1978–2010)
The programme was a replacement for Aquarius, the arts series which had been running since 1970. Presenter Melvyn Bragg was already well known for his arts broadcasting on BBC television, notably Monitor and BBC Two's The Lively Arts. It first aired on 14 January 1978, covering many subjects, including Germaine Greer, Gerald Scarfe and Paul McCartney. It is the longest continuously running arts programme on UK television. From the beginning the series' intent was to mix high art and popular culture. This has remained, and the programme has always focused predominantly on art of the 20th and 21st centuries.

For much of its life, the show was produced by London Weekend Television (LWT) for the ITV network.

In May 2009, ITV announced that the show was to come to an end. Although it was originally reported that the show was ending due to Bragg's retirement, Bragg later made it clear that he decided to leave after they ended the show, and thought ending it was a mistake; according to him, "they've killed the show, so I thought, I'll go as well."

On Monday 28 December 2009 the final ITV edition of The South Bank Show was broadcast, featuring The Royal Shakespeare Company as its subject. Melvyn Bragg announced on this programme that, after ITV's last South Bank Show Awards in January 2010, there would be a series of ten The South Bank Show Revisited programmes transmitted in early 2010, featuring updates on previous South Bank Show subjects.

The production archive for the ITV series, including unaired footage, is housed at the University of Leeds.

ITV had  32 series with 736 episodes, from 1978 until 2010.

Sky Arts (2012–present)
In July 2010, it was revealed that Bragg had bought the rights to the brand and had first right of access to The South Bank Show archives. Sky Arts broadcasts South Bank Show archive editions and hosted the South Bank Sky Arts Awards on 25 Jan 2011, presented by Melvyn Bragg, accompanied by a new arrangement of The South Bank Show theme.

Sky Arts revived The South Bank Show with a new series starting 27 May 2012.

Since 2012 most series only have around 4–6 episodes.

Theme music and visuals
 
The theme music is taken from Andrew Lloyd Webber's Variations composed in 1977 for his brother, the cellist Julian Lloyd Webber. This is based on the theme from Paganini's "24th Caprice". The brand image of the programme is an animated version of a detail from Michelangelo's Sistine Chapel ceiling painting, specifically the image of the Hand of God giving life to Adam. It shows the two hands meeting, generating a lightning bolt.

Subjects
There have been many subjects of the show, including:

1970s
 Paul McCartney in 1978
 Ken Dodd in 1978
 John Peel in 1979
 Satyajit Ray in 1979
 Francis Ford Coppola in 1979
 Rough Trade Records in 1979
 Talking Heads in 1979

1980s
 Arthur Miller in 1980
 Sir William Walton in 1981
 Sir Laurence Olivier in 1982
 Catherine Cookson in 1982
 Peter Gabriel in 1982
 Julian Lloyd Webber in 1982
 Gene Hackman in 1983
 Oscar Peterson in 1984
 Weather Report in 1984
 Elisabeth Vellacott in 1984
 Sir Alec Guinness in 1985
 Francis Bacon in 1985
 Simon Rattle in 1985
 John Cleese in 1986
 Michala Petri in 1986
 Fay Godwin in 1986
 Anthony Green in 1987
 Maria Callas in 1987
 Eric Clapton in 1987
 The Smiths in 1987
 Penguin Cafe Orchestra in 1987
 John Houseman in 1988
 Paul Bowles in 1988
 Ben Elton in 1989
 John Zorn in 1989
 Robert Redford in 1989

1990s
 Mark Morris Dance Group in 1990
 Pet Shop Boys in 1990
 Terry Gilliam in 1991
 Stan Laurel in 1991
 Douglas Adams in 1992
 Sir Richard Attenborough in 1992
 Sgt Pepper's Lonely Hearts Club Band in 1992
 Viviana Durante in 1992
 Anthony Hopkins in 1992
 Billy Connolly in 1992 and 2010
 Sylvie Guillem in 1993
 Paul Simon in 1993
 Clive Barker in 1994
 David Mamet in 1994
 Coronation Street in 1995
 Miriam Makeba in 1995
 Clint Eastwood in 1995
 k. d. lang in 1995
 Sting in 1996
 John Galliano in 1996
 Elaine Paige in 1996
 Marlene Dietrich in 1996
 Sir John Mills in 1996
 Bee Gees in 1997
 Björk in 1997
 Iain Banks in 1997
 Scanner in 1997
 Gillian Wearing/Gary Hume in 1998 
 Will Self in 1998
 Bee Gees in 1999
 Cher in 1999
 Blur in 1999
 Tracey Emin in 1999

2000s
 Judith Weir in 2001
 Bernie Taupin in 2002
 Juan Diego Florez in 2002
 Ewan McGregor in 2003
 Dance Theatre of Harlem in 2004
 Ronnie Wood in 2004
 Sir Malcolm Arnold in 2004
 The Darkness in 2004
 John Lennon's jukebox in 2004
 Iggy Pop in 2004
 Little Britain in 2005
 Alan Bennett in 2005
 Dusty Springfield in 2006
 Steve Reich in 2006
 J. G. Ballard in 2006
 George Michael in 2006
 Grayson Perry in 2006
 Gerhard Richter in 2006
 Jarvis Cocker in 2007
 Victoria Wood in 2007
 June Whitfield in 2007
 Annie Lennox in 2007
 Eric Clapton in 2007
 The Nutcracker (ballet) in 2007
 Nick Park in 2007
 Tim Burton in 2008
 Liza Minnelli in 2008
 James Bond in 2008
 Will Young in 2009
 Peter Kosminsky in 2009
 The Cambridge Footlights in February 2009
 The Wagner family in September 2009
 Coldplay in September 2009
 Disney Pixar in October 2009
 Elbow in November 2009
 The Royal Shakespeare Company in December 2009

2010s
 Tracey Ullman in 2018
 Jed Mercurio in 2019

Directors
Directors who have made editions of the programme include:

Podcast 
From 18 September 2006, ITV released podcast of the interviews from the show, including extra material not included in the broadcast editions.

Awards
The programme has been awarded more than 110 awards (including 12 BAFTAs, 5 Prix Italia and 4 RTS Awards). Pat Gavin's animated title sequences have won two BAFTAs.

Parodies

The comedy series Dead Ringers often parodied The South Bank Show. It does this in a series of sketches called South Bank, a cross between The South Bank Show and the American cartoon South Park, set in the South Bank of London. In these sketches, Melvyn Bragg is Stan Marsh, Alan Yentob is Kyle Broflovski, Mark Lawson is Eric Cartman and Kenneth Branagh is Kenny McCormick.

A sketch in The Smell of Reeves and Mortimer featured Vic Reeves as Melvyn Bragg (with felt-tip marks on his face) presenting a feature on fictional folk singers Mulligan and O'Hare. Reeves depicts Bragg as an unlikely A-Team obsessive.

Harry Enfield's TV film Norbert Smith - a Life is a parody edition of The South Bank Show.

Ricky Gervais and Stephen Merchant's second series of Extras featured a reference to a fictional episode of The South Bank Show focused on madcap children's television presenters Dick and Dom.

Private Eye tends to parody Melvyn Bragg's name, and Spitting Image would rather accentuate his nasal accent. As Spitting Image was often aired immediately before The South Bank Show, episodes would often end with a send-up of Bragg, most notably in one episode having him advise viewers to switch off their televisions to avoid watching it.

Benny Hill once parodied Bragg in a 1978 episode of The Benny Hill Show as Melvyn Dragg. The name of the show was also parodied, and it was called "The South Blank Show."

References

External links
The South Bank Show at itv.com (Archive)
South Bank Show Production Archive at the University of Leeds
Complete list of subjects from epguides.com

Variations performance by Julian Lloyd Webber and Colosseum II, from YouTube

1978 British television series debuts
1970s British documentary television series
1980s British documentary television series
1990s British documentary television series
2000s British documentary television series
2010s British documentary television series
2020s British documentary television series
Arts in the United Kingdom
ITV documentaries
Sky UK original programming
London Weekend Television shows
Television series about art
Television series by ITV Studios
English-language television shows
British television series revived after cancellation